Poruba may refer to:

Czech Republic
Poruba (Orlová), a village, now administratively a part of the town of Orlová
Poruba (Ostrava), a district of the city of Ostrava

Slovakia
Dolná Poruba, a village in Trenčín District
Kamenná Poruba, Žilina District, a village in Žilina District
Kamenná Poruba, Vranov nad Topľou District, a village in Vranov nad Topľou District
Poruba, Prievidza District, a village in Prievidza District
Poruba pod Vihorlatom, a village in Michalovce District
Ruská Poruba, a village in Humenné District
Šarišská Poruba, a village in Prešov District
Veterná Poruba, a village in Liptovský Mikuláš District
Závažná Poruba, a village in Liptovský Mikuláš District

See also
Poręba (disambiguation)